El Bilad is an Arabic-language satellite television channel broadcasting from Algiers.

Programming

Current affairs

Animated series

References

External links
 www.elbilad.net

Arab mass media
Television in Algeria
Arabic-language television stations
Arabic-language television
Television channels and stations established in 2014
Television stations in Algeria
2014 establishments in Algeria